Pellaea bridgesii is a species of fern known by the common name Bridges' cliffbrake. It is native to an area of the western United States from northern California to Idaho, where it grows in rocky granitic cliffs and slopes.

Pellaea bridgesii grows from a branching brown rhizome. Each leaf is up to 30 or 35 centimeters long. It is composed of a straight brown rachis lined with widely spaced leathery, blue-green leaflets which are round to oval and sometimes folded over. The edges of the leaflets are not rolled under and do not cover the sporangia on the undersides.

External links
Jepson Manual Treatment - Pellaea bridgesii'
USDA Plants Profile; Pellaea bridgesii'
Flora of North America
''Pellaea bridgesii''' - Photo gallery

bridgesii
Ferns of California
Ferns of the United States
Flora of the West Coast of the United States
Flora of the Western United States
Flora of the Sierra Nevada (United States)
Flora of Idaho
Flora of Oregon
Endemic flora of the United States